Kenneth Nathaniel Medwood (born December 14, 1987 in Belize City) is a Belizean track and field athlete, specializing in the 400 metres hurdles.  He competed in the 2011 IAAF World Championships in Athletics and was his nation's flagbearer in the opening ceremonies of the 2012 Summer Olympics.

Biography 
Medwood grew up in Los Angeles, attending Theodore Roosevelt High School, where he was a three time Los Angeles City Section Champion in the high jump.  He holds the Frosh/Soph division record.  In both 2005 and 2006, he finished in a tie for 4th place at the CIF California State Meet.  He also played basketball and tennis.

Next he attended East Los Angeles College where he began to excel in the long hurdles.  He was the state community college champion both years, establishing the state record in the 400 hurdles at 51.63.

He moved on to compete at Long Beach State University where he was runner up in the Big West Conference in both the 400 hurdles and long jump in his first season. He won the 2010 Big West title in the 400 meter hurdles in a then personal best 49.66, which also was his second time breaking the school record during his senior season. He ended the year at the NCAA championships, where he finished as the 17th best collegiate hurdler in the nation.

He set his personal record in the 400 hurdles at the 2012 Mt. SAC Relays, running 49.54.

Personal bests
200 m: 21.49 s (wind: +1.0 m/s) –  Norwalk, California, April 17, 2010
400 m: 47.83 s  –  Walnut, California, April 12, 2008
400 m hurdles: 49.54 s –  Walnut, California, April 21, 2012
Long jump: 7.49 m (wind: -0.8 m/s) –  Northridge, California, May 14, 2010

Achievements

References

External links

Tilastopaja biography

1987 births
Living people
Belizean male sprinters
Athletes (track and field) at the 2012 Summer Olympics
Olympic athletes of Belize
Athletes (track and field) at the 2011 Pan American Games
Pan American Games competitors for Belize
People from Belize City
Track and field athletes from Los Angeles
Belizean emigrants to the United States
Long Beach State Beach men's track and field athletes
Athletes (track and field) at the 2014 Commonwealth Games
World Athletics Championships athletes for Belize
Belizean male hurdlers
Commonwealth Games competitors for Belize
Central American Games gold medalists for Belize
Central American Games medalists in athletics